Ronnie Chokununga (born 5 March 1992) is a Zimbabwean first-class cricketer who plays for Mid West Rhinos.

References

External links
 

1992 births
Living people
Zimbabwean cricketers
Mid West Rhinos cricketers
Sportspeople from Mashonaland Central Province